Matthijs Accama (1702–1783) was a Dutch painter. The brother of Bernardus, he was born at Leeuwarden, in 1702. He went to Italy, where he copied, with considerable talent, several pictures of the ancient masters. He died at his native town in 1783. He painted historical and emblematical subjects.

References
 

1702 births
1783 deaths
People from Leeuwarden
18th-century Dutch painters
18th-century Dutch male artists
Dutch male painters